Pristimantis lythrodes, also known as Lescure's robber frog, is a species of frog in the family Strabomantidae. It is found in northern Peru (Loreto Region) and in southern Colombia (Amazonas Department) near the Peruvian border.
Its natural habitats are tropical moist lowland forests and swamps.

References

lythrodes
Amphibians of Peru
Amphibians of Colombia
Amphibians described in 1980
Taxonomy articles created by Polbot